Adventure in Morocco (Finnish: Rantasalmen sulttaani) is a 1953 Finnish comedy film directed by Eddie Stenberg and starring Assi Nortia, Esa Pakarinen and Oke Tuuri.

Cast
 Assi Nortia as Senora Carmen Manzano  
 Esa Pakarinen as Esa Pakarinen  
 Oke Tuuri as Ville Lipponen  
 Kauko Käyhkö as Senor Juan Manzano  
 Heimo Lepistö as Paperboy  
 Veikko Sorsakivi as Outsider at the insets  
 Ossi Skurnik as Receptionist  
 Siiri Angerkoski as Jumbu  
 Börje Lampenius as Senor singing the serenade  
 Rita Elmgren as The Singing Senorita  
 Jalmari Parikka as Ticket vendor  
 Kalle Peronkoski as Bartender  
 Nestori Lampi as Man taking a siesta  
 Anton Soini as Accordion player  
 Ahmed Riza as Portieer of the Maroccon hotel  
 Marita Nordberg as Harem Girl  
 Eva Gyldén as Harem Girl  
 Maija Routavuo as Harem Girl  
 Ulla Sandqvist as Harem girl  
 Uuno Montonen as Eunuch  
 Matti Aulos as Pasha Ahmed-Lipp-Alih  
 Joel Asikainen as Black Servant  
 Mej-Ling Axberg as Dancer

References

Bibliography 
 Qvist, Per Olov & von Bagh, Peter. Guide to the Cinema of Sweden and Finland. Greenwood Publishing Group, 2000.

External links 
 

1953 films
1953 comedy films
Finnish comedy films
1950s Finnish-language films
Films directed by Eddie Stenberg
Finnish black-and-white films